S. robusta  may refer to:
 Sauvagella robusta, a fish species endemic to Madagascar
 Scaphella robusta, a sea snail species
 Serrata robusta, a sea snail species
 Shorea robusta, the sal or shala tree, a tree species
 Sillago robusta, the stout whiting, the yellow-cheek whiting or school whiting, a benthic marine fish species endemic to Australia

Synonyms
 Stipa robusta, a synonym for Achnatherum robustum, the sleepy grass, a perennial plant species found in the U.S. Midwest

See also
 Robusta (disambiguation)